District Jail Rawalpindi was a prominent jail in Rawalpindi, Pakistan located opposite Rawalpindi District Courts. The Jail was inherited by the Punjab Prisons Department besides 18 other Jails after independence.

On 4 April 1979, the former President and Prime Minister of Pakistan, Zulfiqar Ali Bhutto was hanged to death in this jail.

In 1986, a new Jail was constructed on Adiala Road nearly 13 kilometres away from the District Courts which was named Central Jail Rawalpindi.

The old jail was demolished in 1988 on the orders of military dictator Gen. Zia-ul-Haq and the grounds converted into Jinnah Park.

Some, especially activists of Zulfiqar Ali Bhutto's Pakistan Peoples Party believe that the District Jail Rawalpindi was demolished to destroy tangible reminders of Bhutto i.e. his death cell, execution gallows etc. which the Party and his children could use to gain sympathies of the world at large and to launch effective political campaign against Zia-ul-Haq.

There is now a small monument marking the exact spot where the gallows Bhutto was hanged from once stood, although it is overshadowed by the McDonald's and multiplex movie theatre which share the park with amusement rides, jogging track and other sports facilities.

See also

 Government of Punjab, Pakistan
 Punjab Prisons (Pakistan)
 Central Jail Faisalabad
 Central Jail Lahore
 Prison Officer
 Headquarter Jail
 Central Jail Rawalpindi
 National Academy for Prisons Administration

References

External links
 Official website of Punjab Prisons (Pakistan)

]

Defunct prisons in Pakistan
Demolished buildings and structures in Pakistan
Buildings and structures demolished in 1988